Torque ripple is an effect seen in many electric motor designs, referring to a periodic increase or decrease in output torque as the motor shaft rotates. It is measured as the difference in maximum and minimum torque over one complete revolution, generally expressed as a percentage.

Examples
A common example is "cogging torque" due to slight asymmetries in the magnetic field generated by the motor windings, which causes variations in the reluctance depending on the rotor position. This effect can be reduced by careful selection of the winding layout of the motor, or through the use of realtime controls to the power delivery.

References
"Torque ripple", Emetor

Electric motors
Torsional vibration